Of Freaks and Men is a 1998 Russian historical comedy-drama film directed by Aleksei Balabanov.

Synopsis 
In the beginning of the twentieth century, two seemingly prosperous families become associated with the mysterious Johann, the owner of a photo studio, in the basement of which a certain photographic theater honouring the Marquise de Sade was created. Photographic postcards are produced with the humbled nakedness of the human body, causing lust and gloating triumph of power. Johann has the look of a photographer who knows how to see angel curls and a sweet smile in a girl, and the same look that corrupts the body, the look of a pornographer. Over and over again, Johann destroys the well-being of families and turns ordinary people into freaks, seized with vice.

Premise
Filmed initially in black and white, then entirely in sepia tone, this film set in turn of the century Russia is centered on two families and their decline at the hands of one man, Johann, and his pornographic endeavours. Hailed by some as a masterpiece, the movie comments on the decline of Russian society as a result of the rise of capitalism.

Soundtrack
The soundtrack is taken from Prokofiev's ballet, Romeo and Juliet; and Mussorgsky's Pictures at an Exhibition.

Awards
At the 1998 Russian Guild of Film Critics Awards the picture was awarded the prizes for Best Director (Alexei Balabanov), Best Director of Photography (Sergei Astakhov), Best Art Direction (Vera Zelinskaya), Best Male Actor (Sergei Makovetsky) and Best Supporting Actor (Maksim Sukhanov).

At the Nika Awards the film received the prizes for Best Film and Best Director (Alexei Balabanov).

See also 
List of post-1960s films in black-and-white
Sadism and masochism in fiction

References

External links
 
Of Freaks and Men on Kinopoisk
Of Freaks and Men on [[Чапаев]]

1998 films
Russian black-and-white films
Russian historical comedy-drama films
1990s historical comedy-drama films
BDSM in films
Films about child abuse
Films about pornography
Films set in the 1900s
Films set in the Russian Empire
Films set in Saint Petersburg
Films shot in Saint Petersburg
1990s Russian-language films
Films directed by Aleksei Balabanov